Southern Pacific was an American country rock band that existed from 1983 to 1991. They are best known for hits such as "Any Way the Wind Blows" (1989), which was used in the soundtrack for the film Pink Cadillac starring Clint Eastwood and Bernadette Peters, and "New Shade of Blue" (1988, their highest-ranking single on the country charts in November of that year). Southern Pacific was named New Country Group of the Year when they debuted and have been honored by having their name added to the Country Music Association's Walkway of Stars in Nashville, Tennessee.

History
The band was formed in 1983 with former Doobie Brothers members Keith Knudsen and John McFee and bassist Jerry Scheff. Additional founding members include Tim Goodman on vocals and keyboardist Glen Hardin.  The group signed with Warner Bros. Records in 1984 through which their debut album, Southern Pacific was released the following year. Scheff left after the album debuted and was replaced by Stu Cook of Creedence Clearwater Revival, while Kurt Howell replaced Hardin on keyboards. Cook and Howell would join the others in the release of Killbilly Hill in 1986. This album would feature the cover of Bruce Springsteen's "Pink Cadillac". Goodman left after the second album to pursue a solo career and was replaced by David Jenkins (formerly of Pablo Cruise) in 1987 in time for the production of the group's third album Zuma (1988) where their highest ranking single "New Shade of Blue" was included. Jenkins left after Zuma and the group remained a quartet for the final album County Line (1989) which included the single "Any Way The Wind Blows" that was used in the Pink Cadillac soundtrack and film that same year. Southern Pacific covered the Roky Erickson song "It's a Cold Night For Alligators" for the tribute album Where the Pyramid Meets the Eye: A Tribute to Roky Erickson. (Cook had produced more than a dozen of Erickson's songs in 1979, which became Erickson's album The Evil One.) The group disbanded and Warner Bros. released their Greatest Hits album in 1991.

After Southern Pacific's breakup, Knudsen and McFee returned to The Doobie Brothers (who had already reunited in 1987). Knudsen died in 2005 while McFee continues to tour with The Doobies. Cook toured with fellow Creedence Clearwater Revival band member Doug Clifford with the group Cosmo's Factory (now Creedence Clearwater Revisited). Goodman continued to tour and record with The Magic Music Band and his solo project, The Tim Goodman Band. Howell formed his own music group, called Burnin' Daylight. This group also included former Exile member Sonny LeMaire and Nashville songwriter Marc Beeson.

Southern Pacific's four studio albums were reissued in 2003 by specialty label Wounded Bird Records in two double-CD packages.

Cook was inducted into the Rock and Roll Hall of Fame with Creedence Clearwater Revival in 1993. Both Knudsen (posthumous) and McFee were inducted with the Doobie Brothers in 2020.

Reunion concert
On July 12, 2013, Southern Pacific performed a reunion concert at Chain Reaction in Anaheim, California.

Band members

Timeline

Discography

Studio albums

Compilation albums

Singles

Music videos

Album appearances

References

Goldsmith, Thomas. (1998). "Southern Pacific." In The Encyclopedia of Country Music. Paul Kingsbury, Editor. New York: Oxford University Press. pp. 497–498.

External links
[ Allmusic profile]
CMT.com profile

Country music groups from California
Musical groups from San Francisco
Musical groups established in 1983
Musical groups disestablished in 1991
Warner Records artists
Creedence Clearwater Revival
The Doobie Brothers